The Philippines Open in badminton is an international open held in the Philippines since 2006. The 2008 tournament, schedule to be held from June 3 to June 8, was removed from calendar with unknown reasons.

Previous winners

References

External links
BWF: 2007 results

Badminton tournaments in the Philippines
2006 establishments in the Philippines
Recurring sporting events established in 2006